Kuhlmann is a German surname and may refer to:

People
Brigitte Kuhlmann (1947–1976), German terrorist
Charles Frédéric Kuhlmann, French chemist and entrepreneur
Eugène Kuhlmann, French viniculturist and developer of the Marechal Joffre hybrid grape
Hank Kuhlmann, American football coach
Herbert Kuhlmann (1915–1985), German army officer
João Geraldo Kuhlmann (1882–1958), Brazilian botanist
Katharina Kuhlmann  (b. 1977), German model
Keith Kuhlmann, Australian rules footballer
Mark Kuhlmann (b. 1969), German rugby union international
Moysés Kuhlmann (1906–1972), Brazilian botanist
Pete Namlook (born Peter Kuhlmann, 1960), German ambient musician
Quirinus Kuhlmann (1651–1689), German poet
Rosemary Kuhlmann (b. 1922), American singer

Other uses
 Kuhlmann 187-1, a synonym of the hybrid grape Marechal Joffre
 Lucie Kuhlmann, a hybrid grape; see Marechal Joffre

See also
 Cullmann, a surname
 Kehlmann, a surname
 Kuhlman, a surname
 Kullmann, a surname
 Richard von Kühlmann (1873–1948), German diplomat and industrialist